Said Aboulrich, is a Lebanese singer, musician, and songwriter. whose diverse vocal ability and style has attracted a following from different countries in the Arab world . Aboulrich started his music career at a young age; in 2011 he released his first single Am Tesa'al Ala min.

Discography

Singles
 Am Tesa'al Ala min (2011)  
 Alemni Ekrahak (2017)

Videography

References

External links 
 

Musicians from Beirut
21st-century Lebanese male singers
Living people
Year of birth missing (living people)